The Captured Bird is a 2012 short Canadian horror film written and directed by Jovanka Vuckovic, produced by Jason Lapeyre and executive produced by Guillermo del Toro.

Synopsis
A little girl (Skyler Wexler) drawing chalk figures on a sidewalk is drawn to a decrepit old mansion.  Inside, she witnesses the birth of five horrifying apparitions.  They creep towards her, determined to get outside the building and into the world.

Crew

As a result of Vuckovic's reputation in the horror world and former position as editor-in-chief of Rue Morgue magazine, her first film project attracted a world class crew of experienced horror filmmakers. Guillermo del Toro is the executive producer for the film, Karim Hussain is the director of photography, Douglas Buck is the editor, and the special effects and monsters were designed and built by Spectral Motion.

Soundtrack
The score for the film is written and performed by the heavy metal band Redeemer.

References

External links 
 

2012 horror films
2012 fantasy films
Canadian horror short films
Dark fantasy films
2012 films
2012 short films
2010s Canadian films